Port Carling/Butterfly Lake Water Aerodrome  is located  southwest of Port Carling, Ontario, Canada.

See also
 List of airports in the Port Carling area

References

Registered aerodromes in Ontario
Seaplane bases in Ontario